Constant Montpellier (born August 30, 1961) is a Canadian jockey in Canadian Thoroughbred horse racing. In 1993, he won the Sovereign Award as Canada's Outstanding Apprentice Jockey. Montpellier was born in Vaudreuil-Dorion, Quebec.

Prior to his career in Thoroughbred racing, Montpeller was a newspaper and magazine photographer in Montreal. In 2007, Constant Montpellier took up the sport of speed skating and the following year won the Gold Medal in the 40-49 age group at the North American speed skating championships.

In 2008, Montpellier rode 2009 Kentucky Derby winner Mine That Bird in his first two starts.

References
 Biography for Constant Montpellier at Woodbine Entertainment Corp.
Woodbine Entertainment article with photos on Constant Montpelier and speed skating
 May 23, 2009 New York Times interview with Constant Montpellier

Year-end charts

1961 births
Living people
Canadian photographers
Canadian jockeys
Canadian male speed skaters
Sportspeople from Quebec
French Quebecers
People from Vaudreuil-Dorion